Downtown Anaheim is the administrative and historic center of Anaheim, California. It is also known as Anaheim Colony Historic District and is bordered by East, West, North, and South streets.  The historic center of the city is Anaheim Blvd (originally named Los Angeles Street) and Center Street.

Buildings and attractions
The Downtown Anaheim skyline consists of the Bank of America Building and the Wells Fargo Building, which are both over 10 stories high. Other high-rise buildings in Downtown Anaheim include City Hall, West City Hall, the AT&T Building, the Anaheim Memorial Manor, and the Kraemer Building. Anaheim Police Headquarters, Anaheim's Main Central Library, and the Anaheim Chamber of Commerce are also located in Downtown Anaheim. The "Center Street Promenade" consists of shops, restaurants, and Downtown Anaheim's Farmers Market. Other attractions in the Center Street Promenade include Anaheim's "Art in Public Places" Artwalk, and Anaheim's History Walk which was unveiled on June 20, 2007. Also near the Center Street Promenade are The Muzeo, a museum which opened in the Fall of 2007, and Anaheim Ice (formerly called "Disney Ice"), an ice skating rink opened to the public that also serves as the practice arena for the NHL team, the Anaheim Ducks. Also located in Anaheim's Colonial District is the oldest museum in Orange County — the Mother Colony House. The neighborhood includes Pearson Park, named after former mayor Charles Pearson. The Pearson Park Amphitheatre, an outdoor theater, is located in Pearson Park. The Anaheim Packing House is a gourmet food hall opened in 2014 in a former Sunkist packing house.

History

When Anaheim was a rural community surrounded by orange groves, the geographic center of town was at the intersection of Center Street and Los Angeles Street (now Center Street and Anaheim Blvd.) and the central business district was built around the center of town. Prior to the opening of Disneyland, the old business district consisted of establishments such as the SQR Department Store, Chung King Restaurant, and the Pickwick Hotel. Disneyland brought the need for expansion of the Heart of Anaheim. Prior to Walt Disney's death in 1966, the city of Anaheim had plans to construct a forty-story office tower on the other side of Ball Road from Disneyland. Walt Disney knew that the skyscraper would be seen from inside Disneyland, thus altering the theme park's atmosphere. Disney met with Anaheim city officials and an "anti-skyline ordinance" was passed which stated that no high rise in Anaheim could be built which could be seen from inside Disneyland. This forced the city to expand outward, instead of upward. 

Today, the heart of Anaheim consists of three districts: 1) Downtown Anaheim, 2) the Anaheim Resort, and 3) the Platinum Triangle. As Anaheim expanded outward more during the mid-late 1960s and 1970s, the old downtown district began to deteriorate. By the mid-1970s, Downtown Anaheim had experienced severe urban blight. The city began the process of demolishing the old downtown district and replacing it with a new Downtown District with a miniature skyline development. This process took a little more than fifteen years. The only structures from the old business district which still stand today are the old Carnegie Library, now the Muzeo, and the Kraemer Building (the old Bank of America Building)-the tallest building in Anaheim prior to Disneyland's opening in 1955. The tallest building in Downtown Anaheim today is West City Hall at fourteen stories high.

New developments
New skyscrapers are planned for the city's A-Town Project which is currently under construction in the Platinum Triangle District. A-Town is supposed to be Orange County's Main "Downtown District" once it is completed. Downtown Anaheim's newest and most recent developments include the Muzeo, the Promenade @ Anaheim, Carnegie Plaza, and the Harbor Lofts.

References

External links
City of Anaheim
Downtown Anaheim Official Website
Anaheim Colony Historic District Links

Neighborhoods in Anaheim, California